Dəlləkli (also, Dellekli and Dellyakli) is a village in the Zangilan Rayon of Azerbaijan.

References 

Populated places in Zangilan District